The Microscopium Supercluster is a supercluster located in the constellation Microscopium. First noticed in the early 1990s, it has received little study. It is composed of Abell clusters 3695 and 3696, while the relations of Abell clusters 3693 and 3705 in the same field are unclear.

See also
 Abell catalog
 Large scale structure of the universe
 List of Abell clusters
 List of superclusters

References

Galaxy superclusters
Microscopium